Jonathan Chace (July 22, 1829June 30, 1917) was a United States representative and Senator from Rhode Island.

Biography
Born at Fall River, Massachusetts, the son of Harvey Chace and the grandson of Oliver Chace. In 1854, he married Jane C. Moon, and they had three children:  Anna H., Elizabeth M. and Susan A. (the latter deceased). He was also the nephew of famed 19th century abolitionist Elizabeth Buffum Chace and had himself been active in the Underground Railroad during his time in Philadelphia, where he operated a dry goods store.

He attended the public schools and Friends' School at Providence. He moved to Central Falls, Rhode Island and engaged in cotton manufacturing; he was a member of the Rhode Island Senate in 1876-1877 and was elected as a Republican to the Forty-seventh and Forty-eighth Congresses and served from March 4, 1881, to January 26, 1885, when he resigned.

Chace was elected as a Republican to the U.S. Senate to fill the vacancy caused by the death of Henry B. Anthony; he was reelected in 1888 and served from January 20, 1885, to April 9, 1889, when he resigned.  While in the Senate he was chairman of the Committee on Civil Service and Retrenchment (Fiftieth and Fifty-first Congresses), and sponsored a bill  presaging the International Copyright Act of 1891, sometimes referred to as the Chace Act.  He was president of the Phoenix National Bank of Providence, Rhode Island, and was interested in several manufacturing enterprises.

Chace died in Providence in 1917, and was interred in the North Burial Ground.

See also
Oliver Chace
Elizabeth Buffum Chace

References

1829 births
1917 deaths
Republican Party Rhode Island state senators
Politicians from Fall River, Massachusetts
Republican Party United States senators from Rhode Island
Republican Party members of the United States House of Representatives from Rhode Island
People from Central Falls, Rhode Island
Burials at North Burying Ground (Providence)
Underground Railroad people
19th-century American politicians
20th-century African-American people